Jamarl Anthony Joseph (born 12 July 1995) is an English professional footballer who plays as a midfielder.

Career
Joseph played for Hanwell Town in 2018 before later joining Chalfont St Peter from Kensington & Ealing Borough.

In the summer of 2020, Joseph joined Slovak Super Liga side Senica, making his professional debut as a substitute in a 3–1 defeat to AS Trenčín.

References

External links

Non-league stats at Aylesbury United

Living people
1995 births
Association football midfielders
English footballers
Chalfont St Peter A.F.C. players
Hanwell Town F.C. players
FK Senica players
Slovak Super Liga players
English expatriate footballers
Black British sportspeople
Expatriate footballers in Slovakia
English expatriate sportspeople in Slovakia